The 1983–84 Eastern Counties Football League season was the 42nd in the history of Eastern Counties Football League a football competition in England.

League table

The league featured 22 clubs which competed in the league last season, no new clubs joined the league this season.

Braintree changed name to Braintree Town, Stowmarket changed name to Stowmarket Town.

League table

References

External links
 Eastern Counties Football League

1983-84
1983–84 in English football leagues